Monica Mok is a Chinese-born Australian model and film actress. She was nominated for the Best New Performer award at the 28th Hong Kong Film Awards for her role in the film Ocean Flame.

Partial filmography

Film

Television

Film and TV Awards

References

External links
 
 
 
 Monica Mok at chinesemov.com

Living people
Hong Kong film actresses
Chinese female models
1983 births
Hong Kong television actresses
Shanghai Theatre Academy alumni
Actresses from Beijing
Chinese film actresses
Chinese television actresses
21st-century Chinese actresses
21st-century Hong Kong actresses